Udea prunalis is a moth of the family Crambidae. It is found in Europe and China (Gansu, Heilongjiang, Ningxia, Shanxi, Sichuan, Xinjiang). The species was first described by Matthew Denis and Ignaz Schiffermüller in 1775. In the Butterfly Conservation's Microlepidoptera Report 2011 this species was classified as common in the UK.

The wingspan is 23–26 mm The forewings are fuscous-grey, base brownish; first line indistinct, second serrate, blackish, curved, with a narrow deep sinuation inwards below middle, on dorsum whitish-edged posteriorly; orbicular and 8-shaped discal spots darker grey; costa posteriorly spotted with darker and sometimes whitish. Hindwings are fuscous-grey, apex darker;two dark fuscous discal dots; a faint second line. The larva is bright deep green; subdorsal line shining white; head grey-whitish.

The moth flies from June to August depending on location.

The larvae feed on various herbaceous plants, shrubs and deciduous trees.

References

External links
 Waarneming.nl 
 Lepidoptera of Belgium
 

prunalis
Moths described in 1775
Moths of Asia
Moths of Europe
Taxa named by Michael Denis
Taxa named by Ignaz Schiffermüller